Scopula albivertex is a moth of the family Geometridae. It was described by Charles Swinhoe in 1892. It is endemic to India.

Subspecies
Scopula albivertex albivertex
Scopula albivertex ancillaria (Warren, 1895)

References

Moths described in 1892
albivertex
Moths of Asia
Taxa named by Charles Swinhoe